The 2020–21 season is Reggio Emilia's 47th in existence and the club's 10th consecutive season in the top tier Italian basketball.

Overview

Kit 
Supplier: Adidas / Sponsor: UNAHOTELS

Players

Current roster

Depth chart

Squad changes

In

|}

Out

|}

Confirmed 

|}

From youth team 

|}

Coach 
Coach Maurizio Buscaglia was replaced by Antimo Martino but his contract was valid until he was called by Brescia for the role of head coach.

Competitions

Supercup

Italian Cup 
Reggio Emilia qualified to the 2021 Italian Basketball Cup by ending the first half of the LBA season in the 8th position. They played the quarterfinal against the first ranking AX Armani Exchange Milan.

Serie A

Fiba Europe Cup

Regular season

Playoffs

See also 

 2020–21 LBA season
 2020–21 FIBA Europe Cup
 2021 Italian Basketball Cup
 2020 Italian Basketball Supercup

References 

2020–21 in Italian basketball by club